Ivan Oleksiiovych Strebkov (born 28 September 1991 in Pidlissia, Buchach Raion, Ternopil Oblast, Ukraine) is a Ukrainian middle-distance runner and cross country runner. 

He graduated from school No. 3 (2008, gold medal) and a music school (saxophone class) in Buchach. In 2008 he entered the Ternopil National Economy University (now West Ukrainian National University), that later graduated.

His wife is a Ukrainian athlete, runner Nataliia Strebkova.

Sports career 
He started running seriously in the 10th grade of the school.

Achievements 
 vice-champion of Europe in cross-country 2013 (U-23, team)
 bronze medalist of the team European Championship 2014 in the 10,000 m run in Skopje (team)
 champion of Ukraine,
 record holder of "Ternopilska ozeriana"

References

External links 

 
 Ivan Strebkov
 Ivan Strebkov
 Senior Man Race

Living people
1991 births
Ukrainian male cross country runners
Ukrainian male middle-distance runners
Sportspeople from Ternopil Oblast